The Social Justice Party is a democratic and progressive political party in Egypt.

History and profile
The party was established in 1993. It supports left-leaning non-secular democratic and progressive views. It calls for equal rights and duties for all citizens, boosting principles of loyalty to homeland and achieving justice for all citizens. The party fielded three candidates to run for the 2000 legislative polls.

Platform 
 Maintaining the national unity and social peace, enhancing the principles of democracy and socialism and protecting gains of the labor class and peasants.
 Islamic sharia is a main source of legislation.
 Promoting respect between the ruling parties and opposition parties.
 Equal rights for all citizens.

References

External links

1993 establishments in Egypt
Democratic socialist parties in Africa
Islamic political parties in Egypt
Islamic socialist political parties
Political parties established in 1993
Political parties in Egypt
Progressive parties
Socialist parties in Egypt